Universitas Pelita Harapan Conservatory of Music is a private conservatory and music school founded in 2000. It has operated as a division of the Pelita Harapan University of Banten, Indonesia, which was established in 1994 by Pelita Harapan Foundation ( or YUPH). The Conservatory of Music is at the Universitas Pelita Harapan Campus Building B, Lippo Village, Tangerang.

Concentrations 

There are 6 concentrations in the UPH Conservatory of Music and all of them carry a total of 145 credits hours of music courses ad liberal arts courses. An audition and a diagnostic interview are required in the admission process to each of these concentrations. The concentrations are (1) Classical Music Performance. (2) Jazz and Pop Music Performance. (3) Music Composition. (4) Music Therapy. (5) Sound Design and Music Production. (6) Performing Arts Production and Management.

References

External links
 Universitas Pelita Harapan Conservatory of Music
 Universitas Pelita Harapan Conservatory of Music FB Page

Christian universities and colleges